Primož Kozmus (born 30 September 1979 in Novo Mesto) is a Slovenian hammer thrower. His gold medals in the 2008 Summer Olympics in Beijing and the 2009 World Championships in Berlin made him the first ever Slovenian athlete to win both titles.

His personal best throw and the Slovenian record is 82.58 metres, achieved in September 2009 in Celje, Slovenia.

On 8 October 2009, Kozmus unexpectedly announced his temporary retirement from athletics. On 25 October 2010, he announced his return. After moderate achievements in the 2011 season, Kozmus stated his goal at the 2011 World Championships in Athletics was to place in the top eight in the finals. He won bronze with 79.39 m.  Since then, he has also won the silver medal at the 2012 Summer Olympics.

Achievements

References

External links

1979 births
Living people
Slovenian male hammer throwers
Athletes (track and field) at the 2000 Summer Olympics
Athletes (track and field) at the 2004 Summer Olympics
Athletes (track and field) at the 2008 Summer Olympics
Athletes (track and field) at the 2012 Summer Olympics
Olympic athletes of Slovenia
Olympic gold medalists for Slovenia
Olympic silver medalists for Slovenia
Sportspeople from Novo Mesto
People from Brežice
World Athletics Championships medalists
Medalists at the 2012 Summer Olympics
Medalists at the 2008 Summer Olympics
Olympic gold medalists in athletics (track and field)
Olympic silver medalists in athletics (track and field)
World Athletics Championships winners
IAAF World Athletics Final winners
Athletes (track and field) at the 2001 Mediterranean Games
Mediterranean Games competitors for Slovenia